The 2015 NCAA Women's Division I Swimming and Diving Championships were contested March 19–21, 2015 at the 34th annual NCAA-sanctioned swim meet to determine the team and individual national champions of Division I women's collegiate swimming and diving in the United States. 

This year's events were hosted by North Carolina State University at the Greensboro Aquatic Center in Greensboro, North Carolina.

California returned to the top of the team standings, finishing 61 points (513–452) ahead of two-time defending champions Georgia. This was the Golden Bears' fourth women's team title.

Team standings
Note: Top 10 only
(H) = Hosts
(DC) = Defending champions
Italics = Debut finish in the Top 10
Full results

Swimming results

Diving Results

See also
List of college swimming and diving teams

References

NCAA Division I Swimming And Diving Championships
NCAA Division I Swimming And Diving Championships
NCAA Division I Women's Swimming and Diving Championships